Paul Hildgartner (born 8 June 1952 in Chienes) is an Italian luger who competed from the early 1970s to the late 1980s. Competing in five Winter Olympics, he earned two gold medals (Men's doubles: 1972, Men's singles: 1984) and one silver medal (Men's singles: 1980) for his efforts. At the 1984 Winter Olympics, Hildgartner carried the Italian flag during the opening ceremonies.

Biography
Hildgartner also won five medals at the FIL World Luge Championships with two golds (Men's singles: 1978, Men's doubles: 1971) and three bronzes (Men's singles: 1979, 1983; Men's doubles: 1973). Additionally, he won six medals at the FIL European Luge Championships with four golds (Men's singles: 1978, 1984; Men's doubles: 1971, 1974), one silver (Men's singles: 1979), and one bronze (Mixed team: 1988). He also won the Luge World Cup overall title in men's singles in 1978-9, 1980-81 (tied with fellow Italian Ernst Haspinger), and 1982-3.

Hildgartner is the only person  to win a gold medal in men's singles luge and doubles luge at the Winter Olympics, FIL World Luge Championships, and FIL European Luge Championships. He was among the first inductees into the International Luge Federation (FIL) Hall of Fame in 2004, along with Klaus Bonsack and Margit Schumann.

Following the 2006 Winter Olympics in Turin, the 17th turn at Cesana Pariol where the bobsleigh, luge, and skeleton events took place was renamed in his honour.

References

1988 luge men's singles results
FIL-Luge.org January 7, 2004 Hall of Fame induction.

Great Olympians

External links
 

1952 births
Living people
Italian male lugers
Lugers at the 1972 Winter Olympics
Lugers at the 1976 Winter Olympics
Lugers at the 1980 Winter Olympics
Lugers at the 1984 Winter Olympics
Lugers at the 1988 Winter Olympics
Olympic gold medalists for Italy
Olympic silver medalists for Italy
Olympic lugers of Italy
Olympic medalists in luge
Medalists at the 1984 Winter Olympics
Medalists at the 1980 Winter Olympics
Medalists at the 1972 Winter Olympics
Lugers of Centro Sportivo Carabinieri
People from Kiens
Sportspeople from Südtirol